Art Parkinson (born 19 October 2001) is an Irish actor from Moville in Inishowen, County Donegal, in Ireland. He began his professional acting career at the age of seven. He is best known for his role as Rickon Stark on the HBO series Game of Thrones (2011–2013; 2016), and Kubo in the film Kubo and the Two Strings (2016).

Personal life 
Parkinson was raised in Moville, a coastal town on the Inishowen Peninsula in the north of County Donegal in Ireland. His mother, Movania, also an actor, runs a local drama school which Art and his two older brothers, Pearce and Padhraig, attended from a very young age. His two older brothers have also acted in several Irish and British television productions.

He is bilingual, having been educated through the Irish language at both primary school level and latterly at Coláiste Chineal Eoghain. He was selected as Ambassador for Seachtain na Gaeilge le Energia in 2017.

Career 
Parkinson played the role of 'Young Kenneth' in the movie Freakdog. He also appeared in the Irish horror film Dark Touch. In July 2014, Parkinson was cast in the 2014 American dark fantasy epic action Dracula Untold directed by Gary Shore. On 6 October 2014, Parkinson confirmed that his character and Natalia Tena's character Osha would not be returning for the fifth season of Game of Thrones. Parkinson also starred in the Hollywood movie San Andreas (2015) as Ollie, a ten-year-old boy caught up in a massive earthquake in California.

Filmography

Film

Television

Awards and nominations

References

External links 
 

2001 births
Living people
21st-century Irish male actors
Male actors from County Donegal
Irish male child actors
Irish male film actors
Irish male television actors